Camillo Ruini (born 19 February 1931) is an Italian prelate of the Catholic Church who was made a cardinal in 1991. He served as president of the Italian Episcopal Conference from 1991 to 2007 and as Vicar General of the Diocese of Rome from 1991 to 2008.

He was very active as a spokesperson for the Church and was one of the Church officials who most often appeared on Italian television, newspapers and magazines. He has an address by the seminary school about four blocks away from the Vatican.

Biography
Ruini was born in Sassuolo, Emilia Romagna. After studying at the Pontifical Gregorian University in Rome, he obtained a licentiate degrees in philosophy and in sacred theology.

He was ordained to the priesthood on 8 December 1954 by Archbishop Luigi Traglia. He taught philosophy at the diocesan seminary in Emilia Romagna from 1957 to 1968. From 1958 to 1966 he served as chaplain to university students and from 1966 to 1970 he served as a delegate for Azione Cattolica.

From 1968 to 1986, he taught dogmatic theology at the Studio Teologico Interdiocesano of Modena-Reggio Emilia-Carpi-Guastalla, where he was also headmaster from 1968 to 1977.

On 16 May 1983, Pope John Paul II named him auxiliary bishop of Reggio Emilia and titular bishop of Nefta. He was consecrated a bishop by Bishop Gilberto Baroni on 29 June. As vice president of the Preparatory Committee, he contributed to the realization of the Ecclesial Convention of Loreto (1985), which has become a reference point in the dialogue between the Church and Italian society following their difficult relationship of the 1960s and 1970s.

In June 1986 Pope John Paul named him secretary-general of the Italian bishops conference. From 1988 to 2011 he was a consultor of the Congregation for Bishops.

In January 1991 he was named auxiliary bishop and pro-vicar general for the Diocese of Rome. In March 1991 he became president of the Italian bishops conference. He was made Cardinal-Priest of Sant'Agnese fuori le mura on 28 June 1991 and named Vicar General of the Diocese of Rome and archpriest of the Basilica di San Giovanni in Laterano on 1 July 1991. He was also grand chancellor of the Lateran University and the Pontifical John Paul II Institute for Studies on Marriage and Family.

From 29 December 1992 to 2 May 1996, he was president of the Peregrinatio ad Petri Sedem, which promoted pilgrimages to Rome.

Ruini was also a member of the Congregation for Bishops, the Pontifical Council for the Laity, the Administration of the Patrimony of the Holy See, and the Council of Cardinals for the Study of Organizational and Economic Affairs of the Holy See.

Ruini was one of the cardinal electors who participated in the 2005 papal conclave that elected Pope Benedict XVI.

On 17 March 2010 the Vatican formed a commission to look into the phenomenon of Medjugorje, Bosnia-Herzegovina, where six young people have said they have had visions of Mary since the early 1980s. Ruini was its president. In January 2014 the commission submitted its findings to the Congregation for the Doctrine of the Faith.

Ruini was instrumental in the production of a documentary film of the life of Pope John Paul II.

Politics
Ruini was seen as a social and political conservative, close to the positions of Popes John Paul II and Benedict XVI. He was very active in the mass media and was the strongest voice of the Church against the spring 2005 referendum for the liberalization of Italy's legal restrictions on artificial insemination. He commented upon the issue of the 1999 French Pacte civil de solidarité for unmarried couples of the same or opposite sex. In 2007 a bill was proposed in the Italian Senate for a law on civil unions. The bishops conference opposed this proposal.

Retirement
On 7 March 2007, Pope Benedict XVI named Archbishop Angelo Bagnasco to succeed Ruini as President of the Italian Episcopal Conference. His resignation from his other positions was accepted by Pope Benedict XVI on 27 June 2008.

As of 21 June 2013 Cardinal Ruini was serving as the President of the Scientific Committee of the Ratzinger Foundation.

References

External links

 

1931 births
Living people
People from Sassuolo
20th-century Italian cardinals
Cardinal Vicars
Vatican City people
20th-century Italian Roman Catholic bishops
Almo Collegio Capranica alumni
21st-century Italian Roman Catholic bishops
Cardinals created by Pope John Paul II
Pontifical Gregorian University alumni
21st-century Italian cardinals